Stoddart Cottage is located in Diamond Harbour, New Zealand. Built in time for the wedding of his owner, Mark Stoddart, in February 1862, it was the birthplace of artist Margaret Stoddart. Stoddart Cottage is the oldest building in Diamond Harbour. On 15 February 1990, the building was registered by the New Zealand Historic Places Trust (now Heritage New Zealand) as a category I heritage structure, with registration number 3088.

References

Houses completed in 1862
Banks Peninsula
Heritage New Zealand Category 1 historic places in Canterbury, New Zealand
Buildings and structures in Canterbury, New Zealand
1860s architecture in New Zealand